Rajiasar Meetha is a cluster of three villages located in the Churu district of Rajasthan.

Rajiasar is about 32 kilometers from Tehsil Headquarters Sujangarh. The three villages which comprise it are Rajiasar Meetha, Rajiasar Chack and Rajiasar Khara. Rajiasar Chack is mainly dominated by the Jat caste. Some sub-castes Gotra जाटों के गोत्र of the jats which reside in this village are Bhakar (Bhaskar), Dudi, Bijarania, Muhal, and Jakhar. Notable people in this village include, Chaudhary Rameshwar Lal Bhaskar (Retd. RPS), Sh. Gautam Bhaskar (Retd. Addl SP, Rajasthan Police) Moti Ram Jakhar, Ramlal Karwasra, Ramchandra Bhaskar (Presently residing in village Dhanapa, Near Merta in Nagaur District) and Chandra Ram Bijarania.

Rajiasar Chack is surrounded on two sides by Rajiasar Meetha, and two roads join the two villages. Rajiasar Meetha is mainly dominated by the Rajputs (Rathore Clan). Some families of Jats, Scheduled Castes and some other castes also reside in this part of the village. Notable people who live in Rajiasar Meetha include Shree Rewant Singh Rathore (Social worker) Panne Singh Rathore, Sukh Singh Rathore, Bajarang Singh Rathore (Bikaner), Devi Singh Rathore, Chaudhary Sohan Ram Ram Bhaskar, Gopal Ram Bhaskar, Swami Ramchandra.

Rajiasar Khara is located about 1.5 km south of Rajiasar Meetha. It is also mainly dominated by rajputs. Some families of Scheduled castes also reside in this village. Notable people in this village Pratap Singh Rathore, Vijay Singh Rathore.

The nearest railway station is Parihara (on Ratangarh Jn.-Degana Jn. route). However, most of the long distance trains don't stop here and villagers have to go Ratangarh Jn. or Sujangarh Railway Station to catch long distance trains. Trains to almost all major cities of India are available from here. Other villages surrounding this village are Toliasar, Kanwari, Mainasar, Parihara, Budhwali, Rukhasar, Rinva ki Dhani, Harasar (Bada Gaon), Khotari, and Ankholya.

Rajiasar is connected to neighbouring towns Salasar, Ratangarh, Parihara, and Sujangarh through roads. Under the flagship programme of government i.e. Pradhan Mantri Gram Sadak Yojna PMGSY, village has been connected with neighbouring towns with good quality all-weather pucca roads. Buses run at fixed times on the routes connecting these towns with this village. No state-run transport service is available.

Village economy is agriculture based. Agriculture is rain-fed only.  No irrigation facility is available. Groundwater is salty and cannot be used for irrigation purpose. Main agriculture products are Bajra, Guarseeds, Moong, Moth, Til etc.

Some of the persons are serving in armed forces like Indian Army, Indian Air Force and Indian Navy. Some persons are employed in paramilitary forces like Border Security Force and Central Reserve Police Force and State Police and State Armed Police (Known as Rajasthan Armed Constabulary).  Earlier Armed forces were the only attraction but now youngsters are trying for other avenues also. However, still joining armed forces is the preferred employment for village youths.

Some name of army men shri Budh singh rathore Bsf who fought 3 major wars of 1962, 1965 ,1971,) his three son are currently in bsf poonam singh rathore(bsf) padam singh (bsf) pahalwan singh (bsf). Subedar Magan Singh Rathore (Retd.), Naib Subedar Sultan Singh Rathore (Retd.) etc. Some Men in NAVY like Narendra Singh Rathore (Bablu) (Ex.), Mahipal Singh Rathore(Retd), Sultan Singh Rathore(Retd), Narendra Bijaraniya, Ramesh Jakhar. Some Men in Air Force like Sakti Singh Rathore, Girvar Singh Rathore, Ranveer Singh Rathore, Balram Jakhar. On 30 August 2016, L/Naik Shri Rajendra Singh Rathore, 2 Raj Rif, gave supreme sacrifice in guarding the motherland in Kashmir. He was martyred on Pakistan Border in an operation to stop the infiltration from the Pakistan side. His mortal remains were cremated on 01.09.2016 with full state honour in presence of thousands people. Now it is proposed to change the name of Govt. Senior Secondary in his honour. Villagers organise sports events in memory of Late.Rajendra Singh every year which sees good participation.

This village falls under Churu Lok Sabha (Parliament) Constituency. Earlier it was under (Sujangarh (SC)) Assembly constituency but after reorganisation of constituencies now it falls under Ratangarh Assembly constituency.  Shri Rahul Kaswan is sitting member of Parliament (Lok Sabha) from this Constutuency. Earlier his father Shri Ram Singh Kaswan represented Churu Parliamentary Constituency in Lok Sabha.  Shri Narendra Budania who also served as member of Parliament (Rajya Sabha) representing Rajasthan, also represented Churu Constituency in Lok Sabha.
The village has electricity, schools and the drinking water is provided by underground tanks (KUND) that each household has for storing rainwater. Some community Kunds are also there which are collectively managed by village community. Recently, a large water tank has been constructed on the western end of the village for tapped water supply. However, the project has yet not been completed and it is expected that it will take several more years for tapped water supply in the village. The water in this huge overhead tank will be supplied from the Aapni Yojna a scheme funded by Govt. of Germany for drinking water supply in three semi arid areas of Rajasthan i.e. Churu, Hanumangarh and Jhunjhunu.

This village has one school of higher secondary level, one Secondary School for girls and one middle school. 2-3 private schools are also run by local youths for primary school children. Though, village has an Ayurvedic Hospital but generally the post of Ayurvedic Doctor remains vacant and the hospital is of no use for the villages.  Primary Health Centre under Rashtriya Gramin Swasthyay Mission is also in dismal position. Though a MBBS doctor is posted here but due to accommodation problems in village, he resides in nearby town and not of much use to villages. However, after the introduction of bio-metric attendance system in PHC, the condition has improved and now doctor and paramedic staff are available. Basically, this Primary Health Centre works as Immunization centre only. Recently the construction work for the building of a Government Hospital has been started. The medical facilities in the village are expected to improve after the new hospital becomes fully functional, however, the construction work may take time like other Government projects.
The village has recently been connected to the banking system with opening of a smart branch of Bank of Baroda which is fully computerised. The villagers can get basic banking facilities like opening of account, deposit, withdrawals, ATM etc. in this high-tech Branch.
The village have good Internet connectivity and phone connectivity after the Reliance Jio telecom tower was established here. The Internet speed in the village is better than most of the urban areas.

The developmental works in the village have not been up to the desired level and benefit of various schemes of the State and Central Government have not reached to the common man of the village allegedly primarily due to corruption in the lower level of work implementation agency i.e. Gram Panchayat. The present and past Sarpanchs (Head of local level self Government) of the Gram Panchayat are accused of corruption and have spend some time in Jail also due to their corruption activities.

The village has several temples, the oldest being Thakurji's temple which is managed by the family of Shri Ramchandra Swami. Other temples include Nagnechi Mata temple, Hanuman Temple, Gogamedi, Hariramji temple and Pabuji's temple. Most of the temples are located in the western side of the village.

References

External links 
 India STD Codes starting with R
 sahid Rajendra Singh Rathore

R